The Equatorial Guinea women's national football team, nicknamed the Nzalang Femenino, has represented Equatorial Guinea in international women's football competition since 2000. It is controlled by the Equatoguinean Football Federation, the governing body for football in Equatorial Guinea.

In the 2008 Women's African Football Championship they defeated the seven-time champions Nigeria 1–0 in the semifinal and went on to win the championship beating South Africa 2–1. They became the first nation other than Nigeria to win the Women's African Football Championship. Equatorial Guinea played at the 2011 FIFA Women's World Cup.

The team won the 2012 African Women's Championship, winning 4–0 in the final against South Africa.

Equatorial Guinea is the third women's team (out of six) from the Confederation of African Football to qualify for a FIFA Women's World Cup (Nigeria, Ghana, Cameroon, Côte d'Ivoire, and South Africa being the others).

History
They defeated South Africa 2–1 in an Olympic Games Qualifier on 18 February 2007, but lost the return leg 4–2. In the 2008 Women's African Football Championship (which they hosted), they went undefeated in Group A which featured Cameroon, Congo, and Mali. They defeated Nigeria 1–0 in the semifinal and went on to win the championship beating South Africa 2–1. They became the first (and, so far, only) nation other than Nigeria to win the Women's African Football Championship. They made their debut in an international tournament at the 2011 FIFA Women's World Cup, losing all three of their group stage matches against Norway, Australia and Brazil.

In 2012, Equatorial Guinea hosted and won the 2012 African Women's Championship. They won the semi-final 2–0 versus Cameroon, and the final 4–0 against South Africa, with two goals by Gloria Chinasa and one each by Tiga (Adriana Aparecida Costa) and the captain Genoveva Añonman.

Due to fielding Jade Boho without completing her one-time switch (from Spain), Equatorial Guinea was disqualified from the Women's Football tournament at the 2012 Olympic Games.

Problems with naturalised players (mainly from Brazil) caused a ban from the 2020 Olympic women's football tournament and the 2019 World Cup.

Between 2006 and 2010, Bilguissa and Salimata Simporé, a sibling duo from Burkina Faso, used to play for Equatorial Guinea – the first as a central defender and the latter as a centre forward. Beyond the mechanism by which they were naturalized (similar to the Brazilians), the main controversy about the Simporés arose regarding whether they were actually two men. Around April 2011, they were removed from national team by the Italian-born Brazilian coach Marcelo Frigerio, who had recently assumed, just a few months before participating in the World Cup. Since then, the Simporé siblings never were called-up. In 2015, Frigerio, now a former national team coach, told the Brazilian press they are men.

Team image

Nicknames
The Equatorial Guinea women's national football team has been known or nicknamed as the "Nzalang Femenino".

Results and fixtures

The following is a list of match results in the last 12 months, as well as any future matches that have been scheduled.

Legend

2023

Coaching staff

Current coaching staff

Manager history

, after the match against .

Players

Current squad
The following players were named on 9 February 2021 for the 2022 Africa Women Cup of Nations qualification (second round).

Caps and goals accurate up to and including 19 September 2021.

Recent call-ups
The following players have been called up to an Equatorial Guinea squad in the past 12 months.

DCL Player refused to join the team after the call-up.
INJ Player withdrew from the squad due to an injury.
PRE Preliminary squad.
RET Player has retired from international football.
SUS Suspended from the national team.

Records

Players in bold are still active, at least at club level.

Most capped players

Top goalscorers

Competitive record

Worldwide

FIFA Women's World Cup

*Draws include knockout matches decided on penalty kicks.

Olympic Games

Africa Women Cup of Nations

African Games

Regional

UNIFFAC Women's Cup

Turkish Women's Cup

Honours

Continental 
Africa Women Cup of Nations 
Champions (2):  2008, 2012
Runners-up (1):  2010

Regional
UNIFFAC Women's Cup
Champions (1):  2020

All−time record against FIFA recognized nations
The list shown below shows the Equatorial Guinea women's national football team all−time international record against opposing nations.
*As of xxxxxx after match against  xxxx.
Key

Record per opponent
*As ofxxxxx after match against  xxxxx.
Key

The following table shows Equatorial Guinea's all-time official international record per opponent:

See also

Equatorial Guinea national football team

Notes

References

External links
Official website
FIFA profile

 
African women's national association football teams